The Cabinet Office is a department of the Government of Sri Lanka responsible for supporting the Cabinet of Sri Lanka in its policy formulation process. The department was formed in 1947 when the first cabinet of the Dominion of Ceylon was formed, headed by The Rt Hon D.S. Senanayake, first Prime Minister of Ceylon. It was located at the Republic Building, Colombo until moved to Lloyd's Building in 2022. The head of the Cabinet Office is the Cabinet Secretary.

The first Cabinet Secretary was T. D. Perera who was Deputy Secretary to the Treasury, and held the post concurrently. Administration handled by the Assistant Secretary Bernard Peiris, who functioned as de facto Secretary until appointment as Cabinet Secretary. Thus becoming the third person to hold that office. The current Cabinet Secretary is W.M.D.J Fernando, who is functioning in that post since August 2020.

List of Cabinet Secretaries
Theodore Duncan Perera (1947-1951) (concurrent Deputy Secretary to the Treasury)
A G Ranasinghe (1951-1954) (concurrent Secretary to the Treasury)
Bernard Peiris (1954–1963)
G.V.P. Samarasinghe (1977-1979)
M.A.G Perera (1979-1992)
Dharmasena Wijesinghe ( -2002)
N.V.K.K. Weragoda (2002-2004)
Dharmasena Wijesinghe (2004-2009)
Sumith Abeysinghe (2009 - 2019)
Sirisena Amarasekara (2019 to 2020)
W.M.D.J. Fernando (2020 - Present)

See also
Cabinet of Sri Lanka
Presidential Secretariat

References

External links
Cabinet Office

Cabinet Office
1947 establishments in Ceylon